Melanie Cobb is an American  biochemist, currently the Jane and Bill Browning Jr. Chair in Medical Science at University of Texas Southwestern Medical Center.

References

Year of birth missing (living people)
Living people
University of Texas faculty
American women biochemists
American women academics